Alien 2: On Earth, also known as Alien Terror, is a 1980 science fiction horror film, written and directed by Ciro Ippolito before the trademark Alien was registered. It was released following the success of the 1979 film Alien as an unofficial sequel, albeit having little connection to the film.

The film features a score by Guido De Angelis and Maurizio De Angelis, performed by the composers under the pseudonym Oliver Onions. The film co-starred a young Michele Soavi, years before he became an Italian horror film director, and a cameo appearance by Ciro Ippolito (in the role of "Joe"). It was filmed in California, the Cinecittà studios in Rome, and in the Castellana Caves.

Plot
As the world awaits the return of a crew of astronauts from a deep space mission, a young woman named Thelma Joyce appears on a television talk show to discuss caves. Soon after her interview begins, Thelma has a horrible psychic vision. After the spacecraft returns to Earth missing its occupants, a girl on a beach discovers a weird, blue, pulsating rock. Her mother soon finds her with her face ripped off.

Thelma and her husband Roy meet up with their friends for a trip to explore a cave. The group stops at a roadside café to buy food and change into their caving gear. Thelma's friend Burt discovers a blue rock that he decides to keep in his pack.

The group arrives at the cave, and quickly rappels to the bottom to set up camp for the night. Before falling asleep, Thelma tells Roy that she feels that something horrible is about to happen, but Roy calms her down.

The next day, Thelma's friend Jill discovers the blue rock that Burt found appears to be pulsating. The rock opens up and a creature attacks her face. Thelma witnesses the attack and panics. Roy calms her down, then decides to go find Jill's body.

Roy rappels down into a hole and finds Jill, alive and with her face intact. The rest of the group rappels down the hole as well and they strap Jill to a lifter so that she may be lifted out of the hole. Jill is set aside by herself, still unconscious. While the group prepares to climb out of the hole, a creature erupts from Jill's face and attacks Phil's neck. Phil is dragged upside down as the creature slices his neck repeatedly until his head falls off.

The group retreats though they are forced to initially go back to retrieve their equipment. The group splits up into teams to search for a way out, but to no avail. During the search Thelma reflects on what is happening and wonders if the disappearance of the astronauts is connected. Maurine stumbles upon a group of aliens who kill her and Burt who tries to save her. Roy hurts his ankle and is forced to sit and rest. Cliff opts to go and locate Burt and Maurine while the others rest. Thelma telepathically warns Cliff of a nearby alien after their radio goes dead, though Cliff is killed by the alien. Thelma and the others find Cliff who is actually an alien in disguise. Thelma uses her abilities to explode the imposter's head revealing the alien. The alien attacks the other member of the group while Thelma and Roy outrun the alien and escape the caves. On their way back to the city, they discover a police car, but no police officers are in sight. They stop at the roadside café again, but no one is there. Roy tries to call for help on a payphone, but no operator is available. They get back into the car and continue to drive to the city.

Thelma and Roy finally get back to the city, but strangely, they cannot find anyone. They stop at the bowling alley, only to find that it is also empty. Roy goes to the back, only to be killed by an alien waiting there. The alien chases Thelma through the bowling alley, until she hits it in the head and leaves. Thelma runs through the empty city streets, calling for help but getting no answer. She finally stops yelling and sits down in an intersection. Suddenly, text shoots at the screen, warning the audience "You may be next!", implying that the aliens have taken over Earth.

Cast
Belinda Mayne as Thelma Joyce
Mark Bodin as Roy
Benedetta Fantoli as Maurine
Michele Soavi as Cliff
Roberto Barresse as Burt
Valeria Perilli as Jill
Donald Hodson as Mr. Raymond
Ciro Ippolito as Joe

Release
The film was released theatrically in Italy on April 11, 1980 as Alien 2: Sulla Terra ('"Alien 2: On Earth") and in West Germany on March 19, 1982 as Alien, die Saat des Grauens kehrt zurück ("Alien, the Seed of Horror Returns").
The  English-dubbed version was released theatrically in a limited way by Cinema Shares International Distribution (which distributed films such as Creature from Black Lake, Godzilla vs. Mechagodzilla and The Pod People).

In March 2011, Midnight Legacy re-released the English-dubbed version of the film on DVD and Blu-ray in the United States under its original title, Alien 2: On Earth, in a 30,000 copy pressing. The re-release includes fully remastered picture and audio, although during the process, it was noted that some of the audio was missing and it had to be mixed from a variety of sources. This version of the film was believed to be longer than any other version, but a prior Italian television version contained additional scenes not present in the Midnight Legacy version. Midnight Legacy's release contains special effects outtakes and a Dutch trailer.

Critical reception

Adam Tyner of DVD Talk wrote: "James Cameron once summed up his followup to Alien as 'forty miles of bad road'. Alien 2, meanwhile, is 'eighty-four minutes of bad, period'".

Daryl Loomis of DVD Verdict said: "Some people will say that Alien 2: On Earth is a blatant ripoff and some will say that it's a terrible movie. All of those people are right, but given my track record, nobody should be surprised that I love it".

See also

 Aliens

References

External links

1980 films
1980 horror films
1980s science fiction horror films
Films about extraterrestrial life
Films set in the 1970s
1980s monster movies
American splatter films
Italian splatter films
American science fiction horror films
American monster movies
Italian science fiction horror films
1980s Italian-language films
Films set in the United States
Films scored by Guido & Maurizio De Angelis
Films shot in California
Unofficial sequel films
Italian-language American films
1980s English-language films
1980s American films
1980s Italian films